, sometimes simply Da Garn, is a Japanese animated television series that aired in 1992, created by Takara and Sunrise under the direction of Shinji Takamatsu, and is the third of the long running Yuusha or "Brave" series.  The official Japanese title does not include the word "Fighter" in the title, despite the fact it appears on the Japanese DVD box art.

Story
Seiji Takasugi obtained a jewel called "Aurin" which is the earth's alter ego and it has elected him to be the commander of eight brave robots. The Brave robots are sleeping in many parts of the world as "Brave Stones". However, they become super robots by fusing with modern people and machines once Seiji awakens them and they soon follow his instructions. Their enemy is Lord OhBoss who is an invader who aims at stealing the planet's energy with the aid of his subordinates that Da-Garn and the other brave robots must stop in order to save the world.

Protagonists
: An ordinary, cheerful, and hot-blooded 6th grader chosen by the Aurin to protect the Earth from Alien invasion and becoming the boss of the Brave Fighters. Compared to the rest of the cast he has massive lapses in judgment and common sense. Voiced by Rica Matsumoto
: Seiji's childhood friend and neighbor who is a strong-minded and brisk tomboy who gets upset when Seiji's with other girls. Due to Seiji's parents never being around, Hikaru looks over Seiji, often arguing with him. Voiced by Sayuri Yamauchi
: A classmate of Seiji that lives with her grandmother. Hotaru happens to be a girl with psychic powers and has the ability to hear the voice of the earth. Due to this, Seiji sometimes depends on her for help. Voiced by Yuri Shiratori
: The cheeky but sustainable boy who controls Seven Changer and was originally a prince. He was forced to come to Earth after OhBoss destroyed his home planet searching for Planet Energy. When he and Seiji first met, they did not get along. Voiced by Urara Takano

Antagonists
: The first enemy to invade Earth and heavily resembles Char Aznable from Mobile Suit Gundam. As the story continues he becomes part machine and controls a robot named Red Geist. Voiced by Ikuya Sawaki
: A human-like alien that can transform into three forms consisting of a child form, teenage form, and her main adult form. For the first half of the series she attends school in her child form with Seiji for investigations on the robot's leader. Voiced by Yumi Tōma
: A toad-like alien skilled in biology and chemistry that was basically considered useless. After he failed his last mission he was killed by Violecche but brought back to life again into eight smaller versions of himself. Voiced by Kōzō Shioya
: Like Lady Pinky, Violecche also has the ability to transform into three different forms, a cat, a wolf, and a human-like creature. Voiced by Kiyoyuki Yanada
: The second most powerful villain in the series after OhBoss himself. He is often disguised as a UFO while his true form is that of a dragon. Out of all of the antagonists he is the most loyal to OhBoss. Voiced by Shigezō Sasaoka
: The main antagonist of the series, an abstract cosmic entity born at the beginning of the universe that consumes Planet Energy much like a black hole. He commands a moon-like based called the Star of OhBoss in which he commands his minions to cruelly torture a planet for fun before consuming their Planet Energy. He is depicted as a purple ghost with psychic and electrical powers. Voiced by Koichi Chiba

Brave Fighters

Da-Garn Team
 (Voiced by Shō Hayami) : The combination of Ga-Ohn and Da-Garn X.
 (Voiced by Shō Hayami) : The combination of Da-Garn, Earth Liner and Earth Fighter.
 (Voiced by Shō Hayami) : A police patrol car (Lamborghini Diablo in white with blue stripe livery) that can change into a robot at will. Once fused with a Brave stone from a temple, he forms the torso of Da-Garn X. He is the leader of the Brave fighters in the series. Da-Garn temporally stayed within the earth to repair damage that happened while the Brave Fighters we’re battling in Africa. But he eventually returned to lead the Brave Fighters again.
 : A bullet train. It forms the lower half (below the torso) of Da-Garn X when combined with Da-Garn and the Earth Fighter.
 : A white, red and blue fighter jet that forms the top half (above the torso) of Da-Garn X when combined with Da-Garn and the Earth Liner.
 (Voiced by Shō Hayami) : A lion Brave Fighter awakened at Mt. Kilimanjaro when the continent of Africa was splitting in half. Ga-Ohn is the final Brave Fighter and just like Hawk Saber, he wasn't awakened by a Brave Stone. He forms the body additions of Great Da-Garn GX.

The group of Brave fighters that can fly. As Sky Saber, Jet Saber, Shuttle Saber and Jumbo Saber were killed by Seven Changer, but were revived by Hawk Saber. During the final battle, the Sabers went back to sleep as Brave Stones. Being fliers, the Sabers all have fighter jet pilot-like visors and speak in Air Force manners, referring Seiji as "Captain".
 (Voiced by Nobutoshi Canna) : The combination of all the Sabers and is a centaur-like robot.
 (Voiced by Shunsuke Takamiya) : The combination of Jet Saber, Jumbo Saber and Shuttle Saber.
 (Voiced by Shunsuke Takamiya) : A blue two-person jet that can change into a robot after its Brave Stone was activated by the Orin at an excavation site in Antarctica. Jet Saber forms the wings, upper torso and arms of Sky Saber when combined with Jumbo Saber and Shuttle Saber. It forms the wings and a part of the torso of Pegasus Saber when combined with the three other Sabers.
 (Voiced by Mitsuaki Hoshino) : The leader of the Sabers. A jumbo passenger aircraft that can change into a robot at will. Its Brave Stone was attached to an Egyptian tomb that was on board the aircraft when it was activated. Jumbo Saber forms the torso of Sky Saber when combined with Jet Saber and Shuttle Sabers. It also forms the torso of Pegasus Saber when combined with the three other Sabers.
 (Voiced by Ikuya Sawaki) : A space shuttle that changes into a robot. Its Brave Stone was one of the materials the space shuttle was transporting when it was activated. Shuttle Saber forms the legs of Sky Saber when combined with Jet Saber and Jumbo Saber. It forms the legs of Pegasus Saber when combined with the three other Sabers.
 (Voiced by Nobutoshi Canna) : A bird Brave Fighter awakened at the Cave of Light to protect the Earth's skies, also the first fighter to have a physical form and not be awakened from a Brave Stone. He is also the only Saber not to have a plane vehicle mode. He forms the torso and head of Pegasus Saber when combined with the three other Sabers.

The group of Brave fighters that are on the ground. Like the Sabers, the Landers sacrificed their strength to Great Da Garn GX before going back to sleep. Being all land vehicles, the Landers speak with a cocky street gang-ish manner, referring Seiji as "Boss".
 (Voiced by Bin Shimada) : The combination of the Landers.
 (Voiced by Bin Shimada) : The leader of the Landers. A semi-trailer truck. Its Brave Stone was discovered in an Australian mine. Big Lander forms the legs of Land Bison when combined with the other Landers.
 (Voiced by Naoki Makishima) : A navy drilling vehicle. Its Brave Stone was activated in Australia, similarly to Big Lander's Brave Stone. Drill Lander forms the arms and shoulders of Land Bison when combined with the other Landers.
 (Voiced by Yoshio Kawai) : A canary yellow Formula One racing car and its Brave Stone was found in England. Mach Lander forms the lower torso of Land Bison when combined with the other Landers.
 (Voiced by Kiyoyuki Yanada) : A bright red turbo sports car, originally owned by an English woman, Julia. Its Brave Stone was awakened in England like Mach Lander's. Turbo Lander forms the upper torso of Land Bison when combined with the other Landers.

Other Brave Fighters
 (Voiced by Takehito Koyasu) : A Brave Fighter from another planet who acts as an enemy for the first three quarters of the series. He has the ability to change into seven different modes which are a tank, a panther, a griffin, a jet, a semi truck and a space orbit/submarine mode. Later on his true identity becomes revealed to the enemy so he helps Da-Garn and the other Brave Fighters defeat OhBoss. According to Yancha's father he was known as the "God of Legend" on his home world.

OhBoss Forces

Combat Troopers
Redlone's Cruiser: flight, storage, missiles, lasers, and a robot mode armed with torso triple energy heavy cannon, dual hip double barreled energy cannons, storing kamikaze saucers, and machine gun turrets.
Liken Alpha: Appear in episodes 1, 2, and 10. Powers include energy ball form, bladed star form, flight, laser machine gun arms, and shoulder missiles.
Liken Beta: Appear in episode 4. Their only known power is flight.
Wolf G1-40 Beta: Appears in episode 2. Powers include flight and a mouth beam
Adler V: Appears in episode 3. Powers include flight, a 6-tube missile pod in the torso, forehead lasers, a launchable back wings, and launchable fists.
Daimler II: Appears in episode 4. Powers include flight, finger machine guns, and self destructing. It resembles the Zeong from Mobile Suit Gundam.
Angrans: Appear in episode 5. Powers include a drill shield right hand, shoulder heat rays with a rapid-fire mode, and a vacuum tube in the left hand.
Tracegon: Appears in episode 6. Powers include flight, an underside scanning laser that can emit explosive energy and be used to copy machines, speed, and machine gun arms.
Erbenroy: Appears in episode 7. Powers include shield armed with three bomb launchers, flight, and a large forked sword.
Erbenroy Kai: Appear in episode 32. Powers include Powers include flight, a beam machine gun, and an electric tentacle in the right wrist.
Selene Alpha: Appears in episode 8. Powers include swimming, a pair of energy whips for each arm, twin energy beams in the torso powered by a fan in the wings, levitation, and wing missiles.
Redlone Eye: Appear throughout the series starting in episode 9. Their only known power is energy reservoir absorption.
Metal Battler: Appear in episode 9. Powers include flight, underside energy beams in saucer mode, claw hands that can fire energy bolts, shoulder energy cannons, and an 8-tube torso machine gun.
Kraken: Appears in episode 10. Powers include adept swimming and a pair of crab claws.

Armored Beasts
Joanna: Appears in episode 11. Powers include life draining roots that can detect robot disguises, vine regeneration, and eye beams. Reappears in Brave Saga.
Elizabeth: Appears in episode 12. Powers include dividing into cat-rabbit hybrids, high jumping, and two coiling tails.
Victoria: Appear in episode 13. Powers include burrowing, energy absorbing webs from the spinneret, pincer claws, mouth flames, and combining.
Queen Victoria: Appears in episode 13. Powers include coiling, dividing into Victorias, and burrowing.
Francois: Appears in episode 14. Powers include flight and a long tongue.
Jennifer: Appears in episode 14. Powers include pink acid from the head, a rubber-like body, and extendable tentacles from the shoulders and fingers.
Caroline: Appear in episode 15. Their only known power is flight.
Diane: Appears in episodes 15 and 40. Powers include swimming, saw-like feet, spewing mouth acid, and size growth that absorbs projects until it commits mitosis.
Audrey: Appears in episode 16. Powers include speed, sharp claws, and a long tongue.
Irene: Appear in episode 17. Powers include an underside drill, emitting sticky goo, an extendable neck, and three machine guns in each shoulder.
Catherine: 17. Powers include burrowing, four electric tentacles, a laser cannon, and extendable spikes around the body.
Margarete: 18. Powers include super sonic flight, tooth missiles, razor wings, extendable tentacles
Annette: 18. Powers include super sonic flight and a machine gun in each snail-like antenna.
Misery: Appears in episode 19. Powers include four claw arms, extendable tentacles, regeneration, severed pieces becoming individual life forms, and doubling in size every hour.
Butcho's Fortress: Appears in episodes 19 and 20. Powers include flight, lasers all around the body, spy beast combining beam from the underside, and internal vine defenses.
Lillian and Lauren: Appears in episode 20. Powers include flight and a pair of heads.
Marie Antoinette: Appear in episode 20. Powers include extendable left arms, reformation, and mouth lasers.
Gracie: Appears in episodes 30 and 34. Powers include gusts from the false head's mouth, flight, two heads in the false head, three spike missiles from the based on each wing, green adhesives from the mouth, and energy beams from the hole between its necks and from each mouth.
Flora: Appears in episode 33. Powers include swimming, tentacle lasers, dividing into flying laser guns, and electric shocks. Reappears in Brave Saga 2.
Veronica: Appears in episodes 34 and 35. Powers include flight, a hidden body buzzsaw, pedal missiles, tentacles with red electric bolts, burrowing, and swimming.
Jenvuivu: Appears in episode 37. Powers include flight, firing green energy bolts from the body, dividing into three section that can spawn an electric cage, and a tractor beam.

Killer Dolls
Shanerun: Appears in episode 21. Powers include flight, summoning three drones, and palm energy balls.
Shanerun Drones 1, 2, and 3: Appear in episode 21. Powers include flight, disc bombs, and lasers from the palms and soles.
V Vuitton: Appears in episode 22. Powers include flight, finger rockets and machine guns, and an electric whip.
Jubanshi: Appears in episode 23. Powers include dividing into stuffed animals with cameras and teeth, a bladed fan, and a mouth flamethrower.
Eve: Appears in episode 25. Powers include flight and torso missiles and spikes.
San: Appears in episode 25. Powers include flight and twin boomerang-like spears.
Rolan: Appears in episode 25. Powers include flight and a bo staff that fires lasers.
Lady Pinky's Fortress: Appears in episodes 28 and 29. Powers include flight, storage, and laser turrets around the top base.
Gian: Appears in episode 29. Powers include flight, drill missiles from the gold stashes and shoulders, a boomerang on the left shoulder, extendable spear fingers, spinning fast enough to form a drill, and a pink energy whip in the right wrist.
Kaldan: Appears in episode 31. Powers include flight, shoulder missiles, and an electric whip.
Morie: Appears in episodes 34 and 35. Powers include flight, wing heat rays, torso lasers, wing missiles, tentacles with red electric bolts, and swimming. Reappears in Brave Saga.
Albernie: Appears in episode 39. Powers include flight, back and torso missiles, talons, and bladed launchable wings.
Dior: Appears in episode 42. Powers include flight and a torso missile pod,
Gorgeous: Appears in episode 43. Powers include flight, a pair of remote controlled hands armed with restraining nails, extendable constricting hair, and self-destruction.

Other
Violecche's Fortress: Appears throughout the series. Powers include flight, storage, rock-like mines, laser turrets, and remote flying blades.
Mustang VX: Appears in episode 26. Powers include spiked treads, twin energy cannons, and emitting pink electricity.
Joinda MF: Appears in episode 27. Powers include levitation, crystallizing spikes from the body that possess machines, and limb regeneration.
Red Geist: Appears in episodes 32, 34, 35, 37, 38, 40, 44, 45, and 46. Powers include flight, dual shoulder laser cannons, mouth missiles, swimming, and mouth energy balls designed to entrap in dragon form and flight, shield, head vulcan guns, a beam machine gun, swimming, back missiles, a chained mace, and a sword in humanoid mode. Reappears in Brave Saga and Brave Saga 2. Red Geist is a re-design of the character Deathsaurus from Transformers: Victory and despite his name, he is of no relation to the Geisters, the main antagonists from Brave Exkaiser.
Battle Saucer: Appear in episodes 36, 41, 42, and 45. Powers include flight, underside blue energy bolts, and spear crab claws armed with green energy bolts.

External links
 伝説の勇者ダ・ガーン  (Japanese)
 

1992 anime television series debuts
1993 Japanese television series endings
Brave series
Sunrise (company)
Super robot anime and manga